Chang Dongsheng (1908–1986) was a Hui martial artist. He was one of the best-known Chinese wrestling (also known as Shuai jiao) practitioners and teachers.

Biography
Born in 1908 in Baoding, Hebei, Chang was remarkably strong among his peers from his early life. Chang's family roasted chickens, and their business provided sufficient income to allow him private lessons with Zhang Fenyen, a local businessman and Shuai Chiao master who practiced baoding shuai jiao as instructed by Ping Jinyi. Chang distinguished himself early among Zhang's pupils as a promising martial artist. This led to close personal attention and training in areas normally reserved for more senior students. Zhang taught Chang unorthodox training drills and methods to aid him in developing his shuai jiao skill, including using leg sweeps to drive grasshoppers into the air where the correctly positioned hand could easily catch them.

At 20, after marrying master Fenyen's second daughter, Chang left Hopei and moved to Nankin to train at the Kuo Shu, where many Chinese martial artists trained and shared their knowledge. After five years, Tung Sheng competed in 1933 in the 5th National Kuo Shu Tournament (also called the "All China Full Contact Tournament") and won the heavyweight division over several hundred other practitioners, among them the renowned Liu Chiou-Sheng, who went to be his biggest rival. Chang com Now nicknamed the "Flying Butterfly," Chang would go on to win numerous challenge matches before entering China's armed services - traveling across the Kuomintang controlled areas of China to seek out other shuai jiao practitioners in order to test his skills. He may also have first started learning xingyi in this period.

In one of his most famous matches, Chang challenged the Mongolian wrestling champion, Hukli, who was supposedly 7 ft tall and weighed near 400 pounds. The contest was judged under wrestling, without strikes or locks. Chang was victorious, throwing down Hukli repeatedly, despite the size difference.

Chang taught at the Nanjing Central Kuoshu Institute and was the youngest faculty member at the time. There, he exchanged knowledge with other martial arts experts. He created his own variation of t'ai chi and xingyi, Chang t'ai chi, based on Yang-style t'ai chi ch'uan, xing yi and his Shuai Jiao knowledge. Chang traveled across all China and studied under around 70 masters, always introducing himself as a simple student in order to learn everything possible.

Throughout the Second Sino-Japanese War and World War II, of which China became a part, Chang instructed large numbers of Chinese Nationalist troops in Shuai Chiao (including the elite Red Wall paratroopers), while continuing to fend off numerous challenges. When not otherwise occupied, Chang visited several POW camps to test his Shuai Chiao against Japanese practitioners of judo, jujutsu and karate. It was specially important his performance in the Kuang-Si prison, where he defeated judo practitioners Haido Takayama, Kuma Hisa and Masao Hichi. Chang represented the Army in 1948 when he was victorious in a nationwide competition for shuai jiao, Chin Na, grappling and throwing all together.

When Kuomintang troops under Chiang Kai-shek were driven from mainland China to Taiwan by the Communist rebels, Chang left for Taiwan. On the establishment of the National Police University, in Taipei in the Republic of China, Chang was given a position of Senior Instructor in unarmed training by Presidential edict. He taught there for over 30 years.

There are several famous anecdotes about Chang's short temper. In one occasion, a man came to the Taipei National Police University and asked to train with him; instead of answering, Tung Sheng attacked the visitor and threw him down, forcing him to confess that he had actually come to challenge him after the training, something Chang had already figured out. Similarly, Robert W. Smith once travelled to Taiwan to interview Tung Sheng and train with him, but when he asked the master to show him some of his skills, Chang just kicked Smith in the groin.

Never defeated in martial arts challenge matches, Chang died in 1986 of aggressive esophageal cancer.

Personal beliefs 
Chang was a devout and practicing Muslim.

References

External links
 Master Mollica - biography of Chang 
 

1908 births
1986 deaths
Taiwanese martial artists
Taiwanese Muslims
Taiwanese people of Hui descent
Chinese Muslim Wushu practitioners
Chinese male sport wrestlers
Sportspeople from Baoding
Taiwanese people from Hebei
Hui sportspeople